Misumenops is a common genus of crab spider with more than 50 described species.

The majority of the species Mesumenops, more than 80, have been transferred to 13 genera: Ansiea, Demogenes, Diaea, Ebelingia, Ebrechtella, Henriksenia, Heriaeus, Mecaphesa, Micromisumenops , Misumena, Misumenoides, Misumessus, and Runcinioides.

Distribution
Most species of this genus occur in the Americas from Canada to Argentina, with only a few exceptions: 
 Sixteen species are found on Hawaii, one (M. dalmasi) on the Marquesas Islands, one M. melloloitaoi  on Tahiti, and one M. rapaensis on Easter Island.
 Two species (M. forcatus and M. zhangmuensis) occur in China, M. armatus in Central Asia, M. turanicus in Uzbekistan, M. khandalaensis in India, M. morrisi on the Philippines, M. nepenthicola in Singapore and Borneo.
 M. rubrodecoratus occurs in Africa, M. decolor only in Ethiopia.

Name
The genus name is derived from the related crab spider genus Misumena and the Greek ending ops "looks like". This ending is often used to denote closely related or similar looking genera.

Species
These 56 species belong to the genus Misumenops, as of 2022:

 Misumenops anachoretus (Holmberg, 1876) i c g – Argentina
 Misumenops armatus Spassky, 1952 i c g – Azerbaijan, Kazakhstan, Tajikistan
 Misumenops bellulus (Banks, 1896) i c g b – USA, Jamaica, Cuba, Virgin Is.
 Misumenops biannulipes (Mello-Leitão, 1929) i c g – Brazil
 Misumenops bivittatus (Keyserling, 1880) i c g – Brazil, Uruguay
 Misumenops callinurus Mello-Leitão, 1929 i c g – Brazil
 Misumenops candidoi (Caporiacco, 1948) i c g – Guyana
 Misumenops carneus Mello-Leitão, 1944 i c g – Argentina
 Misumenops conspersus (Keyserling, 1880) i c g – Peru
 Misumenops consuetus (Banks, 1898) i c g – Mexico
 Misumenops croceus (Keyserling, 1880) i c g – Colombia to Paraguay
 Misumenops cruentatus (Walckenaer, 1837) i c g – USA
 Misumenops curadoi Soares, 1943 i c g – Brazil
 Misumenops decolor (Kulczynski, 1901) i c g – Ethiopia
 Misumenops delmasi Berland, 1927 g – Marquesas Is.
 Misumenops fluminensis Mello-Leitão, 1929 i c g – Brazil
 Misumenops forcatus Song & Chai, 1990 i c g – China
 Misumenops gibbosus (Blackwall, 1862) i c g – Brazil
 Misumenops gracilis (Keyserling, 1880) i c – Mexico
 Misumenops guianensis (Taczanowski, 1872) i c – Venezuela, Brazil, French Guiana, Paraguay
 Misumenops haemorrhous Mello-Leitão, 1949 i c g – Brazil
 Misumenops hunanensis Yin, Peng & Kim, 2000 c g – China
 Misumenops ignobilis (Badcock, 1932) i c g – Paraguay, Argentina
 Misumenops khandalaensis Tikader, 1965 i c g – India 
 Misumenops lacticeps (Mello-Leitão, 1944) i c g – Argentina
 Misumenops lenis (Keyserling, 1880) i c g – Brazil
 Misumenops longispinosus (Mello-Leitão, 1949) i c g – Brazil
 Misumenops maculissparsus (Keyserling, 1891) i c g – Brazil, Argentina
 Misumenops melloleitaoi Berland, 1942 i c g – French Polynesia (Society Is.: Tahiti, Moorea)
 Misumenops mexicanus (Keyserling, 1880) i c g – Mexico
 Misumenops morrisi Barrion & Litsinger, 1995 i c g – Philippines 
 Misumenops nepenthicola (Pocock, 1898) i c g – Singapore, Indonesia (Borneo) 
 Misumenops ocellatus (Tullgren, 1905) i c g – Bolivia, Argentina
 Misumenops octoguttatus Mello-Leitão, 1941 i c g – Argentina
 Misumenops pallens (Keyserling, 1880) i c g – Guatemala to Argentina
 Misumenops pallidus (Keyserling, 1880) i c g – Colombia to Argentina
 Misumenops pallidus reichlini (Schenkel, 1949) i c g – Argentina
 Misumenops pascalis (O. P.-Cambridge, 1891) i c g – Panama
 Misumenops punctatus (Keyserling, 1880) i c – Peru
 Misumenops rapaensis Berland, 1934 i c g – Austral Is. (Rapa) 
 Misumenops robustus Simon, 1929 i c g – Venezuela, Peru, Brazil
 Misumenops roseofuscus Mello-Leitão, 1944 i c g – Argentina
 Misumenops rubrodecoratus Millot, 1942 i c g – Africa
 Misumenops schiapelliae Mello-Leitão, 1944 i c g – Argentina
 Misumenops silvarum Mello-Leitão, 1929 i c g – Brazil
 Misumenops spinifer (Piza, 1937) i c g – Brazil
 Misumenops spinitarsis Mello-Leitão, 1932 i c g – Brazil
 Misumenops spinulosissimus (Berland, 1936) i c g – Cape Verde Is.
 Misumenops splendens (Keyserling, 1880) i c g – Mexico
 Misumenops temibilis (Holmberg, 1876) i c g – Chile, Argentina
 Misumenops temihana Garb, 2007 i c g – French Polynesia (Society Is.)
 Misumenops turanicus Charitonov, 1946 i c g – Uzbekistan
 Misumenops variegatus (Keyserling, 1880) i c g – Peru
 Misumenops varius (Keyserling, 1880) i c – Colombia
 Misumenops zeugma Mello-Leitão, 1929 i c g – Brazil
 Misumenops zhangmuensis (Hu & Li, 1987) i c g – China

Data sources: i = ITIS, c = Catalogue of Life, g = GBIF, b = Bugguide.net

References

Thomisidae
Spiders of South America
Spiders of North America
Araneomorphae genera